Cowlitz Prairie is located in Lewis County, Washington, United States. The natural prairie roughly lies along the west side of the Cowlitz River, north of Toledo, east of Interstate 5 in Washington, and South of U.S. Route 12. The Lower Cowlitz tribal group's traditional territory includes Cowlitz Prairie. Early 19th century visitors noticed an area mainly cleared of trees and assessed its dimensions from 4 to 6 miles long, 1 to 2 miles wide, adding up to nearly 6000 acres. 

The geographical area holds numerous historical locations in what is now the U.S. state of Washington, such as the Simon Plamondon original settler property after being adopted by the Lower Cowlitz people (1826), the Hudson Bay Company Cowlitz Farm (1839), the Saint Francis Xavier Mission (1839), the first Catholic mission in the state and the nearby Cowlitz Landing location where a first convention was held (1851), leading to the creation of a new territory. Cowlitz Prairie is also known as an early Pacific Northwest mixed ancestry settlement, sometimes referred as a French Canadian or a Métis settlement.

History
The Cowlitz river and a direct portage to Puget Sound located near Cowlitz Prairie have been used throughout history by various regional Indigenous groups. First  newcomer to venture as far as Cowlitz Prairie was Simon Plamondon in 1819 for the Northwest Company (NWC). He returned a year later with two others. The first Hudson's Bay Company (HBC) expedition to travel  through (on its way to the Fraser River) was led by  James McMillan in 1824. HBC  official  George Simpson has been incorrectly credited in the past as the first European to travel through (1828).  

Simon Plamondon now associated with the HBC married the daughter of a Cowlitz tribe leader and built the first cabin in the early 1830s with permission to settle near the tribe. By 1833, Plamondon and François Faignant were successful subsistence farmers soon joined by Joseph Rochbrune and Michel Coutenoir, after also having gained permissions. By 1838, the HBC had permission to set up its Cowlitz Farm facility on 3000 acres, nearly half of the prairie area. By 1841, the Wilkes expedition reported « a Catholic priest belonging to the Columbia Missionary established among the small community here which consists of half a dozen Canadians who have married Indians & half-breeds”. About two dozen workmen were attending the farm sheep and cattle, including some local natives. By 1843, sixty-four people and thirteen families form the settlement. Retired Canadian fur traders with Cree, Ojibwe, Nipissing, Abenaki, and Iroquois ancestry continued to settle and marry into the local Cowlitz and Chinook tribes. This would evolve into a heterogeneous Métis village of log cabins and Indian camps scattered over the remaining acres in the prairie. The HBC had also started to head north of 1846, the border. Twenty early settlers were installed by 1850s by which time the Cowlitz Farm was ramping down after the expiry of the Russian-American Company HBC contract. Following various Indigenous uprisings throughout the Territory of Washington and escalating pressure from settlers arriving through the Oregon Trail, the first territorial Governor ordered in 1855 the Cowlitz and Chinook tribal members to clear out of their homelands. Some refused and found shelter in the settlement. In addition, exclusionary laws limiting land claims made it difficult to secure claims as Americans were also filing claims, displacing squatters allowed in earlier on.  Although shattered by much turmoil, the community nonetheless continued on close-knit French-speaking Catholics, under an influx of newcomers attracted by such a community. Well into the 20th century, many inhabitants of Cowlitz Prairie and surrounding communities continued to speak the Cowlitz Salishan language and French, supplemented by the Chinook Wawa.

Further reading
 Fitzpatrick, Darleen Ann. We Are Cowlitz: A Native American Ethnicity. Lanham, MD: University Press of America, 2004. .

References

French-Canadian American history
Métis in the United States
Landforms of Lewis County, Washington
Western Washington